
Pierre Statorius,  (Tonneville, Seine-Maritime, 1530 – Pińczów, or Kraków 1591) was a French grammarian and theologian, who settled among the Polish Brethren, becoming rector of a Calvinist Academy in Pińczów at the invitation of Francesco Lismanino.

The place of birth and real name of Statorius are difficult to establish. According to the letter of Théodore de Bèze of 12 July 1567, Statorius was a student of his. In the accounts of the Baillif of Lausanne Hans Frisching for 1550 appears "Pierre de Tonneville", who signed his Latin letters "P. Tonvillanus S." and claimed to have come from the "pays Séquanes" which indicates Tonneville, Seine-Maritime, not Thionville, Metz.

He is known in Poland as Piotr Stoiński Sr., (also Stojeński), to distinguish from his son, Piotr Stoiński Jr. (1565–1605) co-author of the Racovian Catechism and teacher at the Racovian Academy.

Works 
He was one of the team which produced the Brest Bible 1558–1563.

He wrote the first grammar of Polish, Polonicae grammatices institutio (1568).

See also 
  family

References

External links 
 :ru:s:ЭСБЕ/Стоенский, Петр
 Pierre Statorius, Polonicae grammatices institutio (1568) in Wielkopolska Biblioteka Cyfrowa (in Latin)

1530 births
1591 deaths
16th-century Polish people
16th-century French people
16th-century Protestant religious leaders
Polish Unitarians
French Unitarians
Linguists of Polish
Translators of the Bible into Polish
French expatriates in Switzerland
French emigrants to Poland
Polish people of French descent
People from Manche
People from Pińczów County